Oxalis hirta, the tropical woodsorrel, is a species of flowering plant from the genus Oxalis.

References

Taxa named by Carl Linnaeus
Plants described in 1753
Flora of the Cape Provinces
hirta